Ellen Löfqvist (born 10 August 1997) is a Swedish professional footballer who currently plays as a midfielder for Piteå IF in the Damallsvenskan. She was the team captain of Piteå between October 2018 and March 2022. In her first season as captain, Piteå won their first National Championship title.

Playing career

International
Löfqvist was part of the squad that represented Sweden at the U19 European Championship in Israel in July 2015, where Sweden won gold.

References

External links
 Ellen Löfqvist at Piteå IF 
  (archive)
  (archive)
  (archive)

1997 births
Living people
Swedish women's footballers
Damallsvenskan players
Piteå IF (women) players
Women's association football midfielders
People from Piteå
Sportspeople from Norrbotten County